The men's 10 metre platform competition at the 2013 European Diving Championships will be held on June 23 with a preliminary round and the final.

Results
The preliminary round was held at 12:00 and the final was held at 16:30.

Green denotes finalists

References

2013 European Diving Championships